Theta Delta Kappa is a social service Greek club on the campus of Lee University in Cleveland, TN, founded in the spring of 1992.

History 
Theta Delta Kappa was established in the spring of 1992 when Shane Smith and Craig Fowler began discussing the need and possibility for another men's Greek club at Lee University (then Lee College).  They approached the administration as well as several potential charter members.  "Theta" received its charter from the school on April 22, 1992 (Founder's Day) and the new club included 10 charter members.

Charter Members
 Shane Smith - president (founder)
 Craig Fowler - vice president (founder)
 Aaron Bellar - chaplain
 Chris Douglass - pledgemaster
 Cary Odom - secretary
 Jon Cline - treasurer
 Daryl Dixon - historian
 David "Icky" Kyle - parliamentarian
 Zach Brown
 Jonathan Kuhlmann

The name Theta Delta Kappa is taken from the first letters of three koine Greek words found in the New Testament that are significant to the identity of the club. The club verse is I Corinthians 3:10 and also plays a significant role in the identity.  The crest of the club was originally designed by Cary Odom in the spring/summer of 1992.

Nine of the original 10 charters returned to campus in the fall of 1992 to "tap" 8 men to join the club.  Shane Smith served as president for the first year of the club's existence and was then succeeded by his vice president, Craig Fowler, who served as president for the next year.  This stable leadership provided much needed continuity for the young Greek club.  Theta Delta Kappa began to grow and eventually found support from the other clubs in the Greek Community at Lee.

Traditions
Theta Delta Kappa selects new members at the beginning of each semester according to the guidelines set by Lee University.  The invitation of a new members is called "tap" as Greek clubs at Lee originally "tapped" the person on the shoulder when asking them to join.  All new members of Theta then participate in an unofficial induction weekend followed by a formal pledge process and formal induction ceremony.

"Theta" is a common nickname for the club.  Members of Theta wear club colors and letters on Tuesday of each week.

Theta Delta Kappa hosts several events for the campus and is involved in service projects for the community.  Some past campus events include: "Theta K Round Up", "The Cotton Club", "Theta Freeze Out", "H2Oak", and "New Year's in November."  Service projects have included: campus cleanup, moving in new students, visiting the elderly, partnering with the Smoky Mountain Children's Home and various other community projects.

Theta Delta Kappa also contains a ladies auxiliary called "little sisters."  This is an honorary position and the auxiliary does not hold voting membership.  One of the little sisters is chosen to hold the honor of "sweetheart."  There are typically between 3 and 8 little sisters and a sweetheart.

Alumni gather annually at the university's homecoming weekend and other alumni are known to meet up with other local alumni on Founder's Day (April 22).

References

External links 
 http://www.leeuniversity.edu
 http://www.thetadeltakappa.com

Fraternities and sororities in the United States